M.F. Horn is Maynard Ferguson's second album on Columbia Records, and the first of his highly successful "M.F. Horn" series of albums. It was also released in Europe as The World of Maynard Ferguson (but with the sides reversed) — not to be confused with the Roulette compilation with the same title. His first record for CBS (The Ballad Style of Maynard Ferguson) was filled with easy listening/pop recordings, but this would be Maynard's first foray into the world of rock music. His recording of "MacArthur Park" would prove very popular with his fans, and would be a concert staple for many years.

Reissues
In 2005, M.F. Horn was reissued by Wounded Bird Records.

Track listing

Personnel

Musicians

 Maynard Ferguson: Trumpet, Flugelhorn, Valve trombone
 Trumpets: Alan Downey, Martin Drover, John Huckdridge, John Donnelly
 Trombones: Billy Graham, Chris Pyne, Albert Wood
 Alto Saxophone: Pete King
 Tenor Saxophone: Danny Moss, Brian Smith
 Baritone: Bob Watson
 Piano: Pete Jackson
 Bass, Bass guitar: Dave Lynane
 Drums: Randy Jones
 Guitar: George Kish
 Conga Drums: Frank Ricotti
 Veena: Vemu Mukunda
 Tamboori: Mohana Lakshmipathy

Production

 Producer: Keith Mansfield
 Recording Engineers: Adrian Kerridge, John Mackswith

References

1970 albums
Big band albums
Columbia Records albums
Maynard Ferguson albums